Dingle Hill is a mountain located in the Catskill Mountains of New York southeast of Bovina Center. Dingle Hill is located south of Mount Pisgah, west-northwest of Meekers Hill, and northeast of Perch Lake Mountain.

References

Mountains of Delaware County, New York
Mountains of New York (state)